Taractrocera danna, the Himalayan grass dart, is a butterfly of the family Hesperiidae. It is found in the Himalayas, from Kashmir through Nepal, southern Tibet and Sikkim to Bhutan. In Nepal, it is found on heights between 4,500 and 13,000 feet.

References

External links 
 Phylogeny and biogeography of the genus Taractrocera Butler, 1870 (Lepidoptera: Hesperiidae), an example of Southeast Asian-Australian interchange

Taractrocerini
Butterflies of Asia
Butterflies described in 1865
Taxa named by Frederic Moore